The Salem Sabres were a professional men's basketball based in Salem, Oregon.  They were last members of the International Basketball League and began play in the league in 2012.  The team was owned by C. Neiman Sports, Inc. and the team's general manager was Joe Becerra.  They played their home games at Chemeketa Community College.  They joined the league after playing one season in the American Basketball Association. After the 2014 season they folded along with the league.

References

External links
 Team page on IBL Website
 Salem now home to the Sabres in the IBL, IBL website link, March 20, 2013

International Basketball League teams
Sports teams in Salem, Oregon
Basketball teams in Oregon
2012 establishments in Oregon
2014 disestablishments in Oregon
Basketball teams established in 2012
Basketball teams disestablished in 2014